Benefactors is a 1984 play by Michael Frayn. It is set in the 1960s and concerns an idealistic architect David and his wife Jane and their relationship with the cynical Colin and his wife Sheila. David is attempting to build some new homes to replace the slum housing of Basuto Road and is gradually forced by circumstances into building skyscrapers despite his initial aversion to these. This is set against the backdrop of 1960s new housing projects. Sheila becomes his secretary but it is unclear if she is helping him or the other way around. As the title of the play suggests it is about helping people and explores some of the difficulties inherent in this or in being helped.

Awards and nominations 
Awards
 1984 Evening Standard Award for Best Play
 1984 Laurence Olivier Award for Best New Play
 1984 Plays and Players London Theatre Critics Award for Best Play
 1986 New York Drama Critics' Circle Award for Best Foreign Play

Nominations
 1986 Drama Desk Award for Best Play
 1986 Tony Award for Best Play

Production Nominations
 2011 New York Innovative Theatre Awards Outstanding Production of a Play, produced by Retro Productions
 2011 New York Innovative Theatre Awards Outstanding Actress in a Lead, Kristen Vaughan (winner) Retro Productions
 2011 New York Innovative Theatre Awards Outstanding Actress in a Lead, Heather E. Cunningham Retro Productions
 2011 New York Innovative Theatre Awards Outstanding Ensemble, Heather E. Cunningham, David Ian Lee, Matthew Semler, and Kristen Vaughan Retro Productions

Productions

The most recent New York City revival of this play is opened November 3, 2010. It was being produced by the Off-Off Broadway company Retro Productions. It starred Heather E. Cunningham, David Ian Lee, Matthew Semler and Kristen Vaughan.

Notes

References

External links
 
 

1984 plays
Broadway plays
West End plays
Plays by Michael Frayn
Laurence Olivier Award-winning plays
Fiction set in the 1960s